The 2022 Maine Black Bears football team represented the University of Maine as a member of the Colonial Athletic Association (CAA) in the 2022 NCAA Division I FCS football season. The Black Bears, led by first-year head coach Jordan Stevens, played their home games at Alfond Stadium.

Previous season

The Bears finished the 2021 season with an overall record of 6–5, 4–4 CAA play to finish in a 5 way tie for third place.

Schedule

Roster

Game summaries

at New Mexico

Colgate

at Boston College

No. 14 Villanova

at Hampton

Monmouth

at Stony Brook

No. 17 Richmond

at No. 23 Rhode Island

at Albany

No. 18 New Hampshire

References

Maine
Maine Black Bears football seasons
Maine Black Bears football